Paso a Paso, released in 2005, is the sixth album by Luis Fonsi. The album was certified Disco de Platino for shipments of 200,000 units in the United States.

Track listing
 "Nada Es Para Siempre" – 3:59
 "Arrópame" – 3:31
 "Escondido" – 4:13
 "Estoy Perdido" – 3:46
 "Por Una Mujer" – 2:51
 "Vivo Muriendo" – 4:10
 "Me Matas" – 3:09
 "Me lo Dice el Alma" – 4:13
 "Para Mí" – 3:03
 "Todo Sigue Igual" - 3:45
 "Paso a Paso" - 3:43

Charts

Single charts

Nada Es Para Simpre

Paso A Paso

Estoy Perdido

Por Una Mujer

Sales and certifications

References

2005 albums
Luis Fonsi albums
Universal Music Latino albums